The 2010 Turkmenistan Cup is 18th since independence of the Turkmen national football cup.

First round
The first round involved 16 teams one of which withdrew. 

|}

Notes
 FC Melik pulled out of the competition.

Quarterfinals
The quarterfinal matches will be played on June 19 (first legs) and June 26, 2010 (second legs).

|}

First leg

Second leg

Semifinals

|}

First leg

Second leg

Final

See also
 2010 Turkmenistan League

External links
 http://www.turkmenistan.gov.tm
 http://www.the-afc.com

Turkmenistan Cup
Turkmenistan Cup, 2010